The ARY Film Award for Special Effects' is an ARY Film Award that is awarded each year to the best Special effects supervisor. It is one of eleven Technical Awarding category.

History
The Best Background Score category originates with the 1st ARY Film Awards ceremony since 2014. This category has been given to the best film Special effects supervisor for his/her work for the films of previous year to the ceremony held by Jury selection.

Winners and Nominees

As of 2014, No nominations were made, winner selection and nomination were wholly made by AFAS Jury of Technical award.

2010s

References

External links 

 ARY Film Awards Official website

ARY Film Award winners
ARY Film Awards